is a Japanese mahjong-themed manga series written and illustrated by Junichi Nojo. It was serialized in Takeshobo's Bessatsu Kindai Mahjong between 1985 and 1990. It was adapted into a three-episode original video animation (OVA) between 1988 and 1990.

It was also adapted into four video games, released between 1990 and 1995.

Video games
 Ryū: Naki no Ryū Yori (June 28, 1990, PC-9801, published by Wolf Team)
 Ryū: Naki no Ryū Yori (February 15, 1991, Sharp X68000, published by Wolf Team)
 Naki no Ryū: Mahjong Hishō-den (December 25, 1992, Super Famicom, published by IGS)
 Mahjong Hishō-den: Shin Naki no Ryū (October 27, 1995, Super Famicom, published by Bec)

See also
Gambling in Japan

References

External links
 

1985 manga
1988 anime OVAs
1990 video games
1991 video games
1992 video games
1995 video games
Bandai Entertainment anime titles
Gainax
Anime and manga about gambling
Information Global Service games
Japan-exclusive video games
Magic Bus (studio)
Mahjong in anime and manga
Mahjong video games
NEC PC-9801 games
Seinen manga
X68000 games
Super Nintendo Entertainment System games
Super Nintendo Entertainment System-only games
Takeshobo manga
Video games based on anime and manga
Video games developed in Japan
Wolf Team games